Grassy Meadows is an unincorporated community in Greenbrier County, West Virginia, United States. Grassy Meadows had a post office, which opened on June 15, 1858, and closed on June 25, 2011.

The community most likely derives its name in part from the nearby Meadow River.

References

Unincorporated communities in Greenbrier County, West Virginia
Unincorporated communities in West Virginia